222 Records is an American record label founded in 2012 by artist Adam Levine, frontman of American band Maroon 5. In 2014, Maroon 5 was signed to the label. 222 Records is distributed by Interscope Records.

Artists

Current 
 Maroon 5 (2014–present)
 Circuit Jerks (2014–present)
 Polly A (2015–present)

Former 
 Matthew Morrison (2012–2013)
 Tony Lucca (2012–2013)
 Rozzi Crane (2012–2016)
 Joe Pesci (2019)

Discography

Albums 
 Where It All Began – Matthew Morrison (2013)
 With the Whole World Watching – Tony Lucca (2013)
 Begin Again – Various Artists (2014)
 V – Maroon 5 (2014)
 Singles – Maroon 5 (2015)
 Ghetto Gold Dream – Polly A (2016)
 Red Pill Blues – Maroon 5 (2017)
 Pesci... Still Singing – Joe Pesci (2019)
 Jordi – Maroon 5 (2021)

Extended plays 
 A Classic Christmas – Matthew Morrison (2013)
 Rozzi Crane – Rozzi Crane (2013)
 Space – Rozzi Crane (2015)
 Time — Rozzi Crane (2015)
 EP1 – Circuit Jerks (2016)

References

External links
Official website

 
American record labels
Adam Levine
Maroon 5
Labels distributed by Universal Music Group
Record labels established in 2012